Jakob Gadolin (24 October 1719 – 26 September 1802) was a Swedish Lutheran bishop, professor of physics and theology, politician and statesman.

Gadolin	was born in Strängnäs, Sweden. In 1736, he studied at The Royal Academy of Turku (which later became the University of Turku). In 1745  he became Master of Philosophy and Professor of Mathematics. He became accomplished in numerous fields such as philosophy and mathematics and from 1753 was a Professor of Physics and in 1762 Professor of Theology.
In 1788, he succeeded Jakob Haartman as the Bishop  of the Archdiocese of Turku which was then a diocese of the Church of Sweden. He held this position until his death in 1802.

He served as a representative of the clergy in the Diocese of Turku in the Swedish Riksdag of the Estates 1755–56, 1760–62 and 1771–72. In 1751, Gadolin was elected a member of the Royal Swedish Academy of Sciences. He was a member of Pro Fide et Christianismo, a Christian education society.

Jakob Gadolin was married to Elisabet Browallia (1737–1793) and was the father of the noted chemist, Johan Gadolin.

See also
List of Bishops of Turku

References

External links

1719 births
1802 deaths
People from Strängnäs Municipality
Finnish Lutheran theologians
Finnish scientists
Finnish politicians
Finnish philosophers
Lutheran archbishops and bishops of Turku
Members of the Riksdag of the Estates
18th-century Lutheran bishops
19th-century Lutheran bishops
Members of the Royal Swedish Academy of Sciences
18th-century Protestant theologians
18th-century Swedish politicians